Washakie Glacier is on the east side of the Continental Divide in the southern Wind River Range in the U.S. state of Wyoming. The glacier is in the Popo Agie Wilderness of Shoshone National Forest. Washakie Glacier is situated in a north facing cirque between Mount Washakie and Bair Peak.

See also
 List of glaciers in the United States

References

Glaciers of Fremont County, Wyoming
Shoshone National Forest
Glaciers of Wyoming